Peter Ho Davies (born 30 August 1966), is a contemporary British writer of Welsh and Chinese descent.

Biography
Born and raised in Coventry, Davies was a pupil at King Henry VIII School. He studied physics at Manchester University and then English at Cambridge University.

In 1992, he moved to the United States to study in the graduate creative writing program at Boston University. He has taught at the University of Oregon and at Emory University and is currently a professor in the Helen Zell MFA Program in Creative Writing at the University of Michigan in Ann Arbor.

Awards and honors 
Davies has received grants from the Guggenheim Foundation and the National Endowment for the Arts. In 2003, he was named by Granta magazine as one of twenty 'Best of Young British Novelists'.

His short fiction has appeared in The Atlantic, Harper's and The Paris Review and been widely anthologized, appearing in Prize Stories: The O. Henry Awards 1998, and Best American Short Stories 1995, 1996, and 2001. The Boston Globe named The Welsh Girl one of the best fiction books of 2007, and People named A Lie Someone Told You About Yourself one of the ten best books of the year.

Publications

Short story collections
 The Ugliest House in the World (1997)
 Equal Love (2000)

Novels
 The Welsh Girl (2007)
 The Fortunes (2016)
 A Lie Someone Told You About Yourself (2021)

Non Fiction 

 The Art of Revision: The Last Word (2021)

References and notes

External links
Author website
 

British writers
1966 births
Living people
Alumni of the University of Cambridge
Alumni of the University of Manchester
University of Michigan faculty
People from Coventry
John Llewellyn Rhys Prize winners
PEN/Malamud Award winners
People educated at King Henry VIII School, Coventry
University of Oregon faculty
Writers from Oregon